Conversation with the Beast is a 1996 German film directed by Armin Mueller-Stahl, and written by Mueller-Stahl and Tom Abrams. The film is about an American researcher (played by Bob Balaban), who interviews a 103-year-old man claiming to be Adolf Hitler. The film was released on 10 September 1996 at the 1996 Toronto International Film Festival, shown at over twenty film festivals worldwide, but never released on video.

Plot
The film is based on the idea that Adolf Hitler, the "beast" of the film title, is still alive—hidden in a bunker—at the age of 103 (in 1992). The protagonist sits in a wheelchair and speaks English. This "real" Hitler invites six Hitler doubles into the bunker, furnished with Nazi paraphernalia, in which he lives with his apparently very young wife Hortense.
Webster, an American journalist, breaks into the bunker and asks uncomfortable questions. He interviews the self-proclaimed Hitler for ten days before shooting him on the last day of the interview, as he is now sure that he is facing the real Hitler.

Cast and characters
 Armin Mueller-Stahl as Hitler
 Bob Balaban as Webster
 Katharina Böhm as Hortense
 Hark Bohm as Dr. Hassler
 Peter Fitz as Dr. Segebrecht
 Dieter Laser as Peter Hollsten
 Joachim Dietmar Mues as Heinrich Pfarmann
 Kai Rautenberg as Horst Sievers
 Harald Juhnke as Hitler double
 Otto Sander as Hitler double

See also
 Downfall (2004 film)

References

External links
 
 Gespräch mit dem Biest at Filmportal.de

1996 films
German drama films
Cultural depictions of Adolf Hitler
1990s German-language films
1996 drama films
1990s German films
Films set in bunkers